The International Braille Chess Association (IBCA) is organization for blind and visually impaired chess players. The IBCA is a FIDE-affiliated chess organization as well as a part of the International Blind Sports Federation. The International Braille Chess Association originated informally in 1951 with the organization (by Reginald Walter Bonham) of the first international correspondence chess tournament for blind players; the tournament included 20 players representing 10 countries. It first organized an over-the-board tournament in 1958, with representatives from seven countries. Today, it has grown to encompass over 50 member nations around the world. The IBCA hosts two major competitions: the Blind Chess Olympiad and the Blind World Chess Championship.

Rule modifications

Although most of the rules in blind chess are consistent with normal chess, there are a few modifications to the equipment to aid blind and visually impaired players:
 Either player may demand the use of two boards, the sighted player using a standard board, the visually impaired player using a board that is specially constructed as follows: 
 All the black squares are raised about 3–4 mm above the white squares on the chessboard. By feeling the squares, the player is able to determine whether the square is a black or a white one.
 Each of the squares on the board has a hole in the center so that the chess pieces can be fixed in these holes.
 Each of the pieces has a downward projection (nail) at the base, which fits into the hole in the squares on the board, thereby fixing the piece securely on the board.
 All the black pieces have a pin fixed on their heads helping the player distinguish between a white and a black piece.

After making every move, each player is required to announce their move aloud to their opponent. Instead of writing the moves on a chess score sheet, the visually impaired player writes the moves in braille or records the moves on a voice recorder.

References

External links
 
 British Braille Chess Association official website

Chess organizations
Parasports organizations
Blindness organisations in Germany
International organisations based in Germany
Sports organizations established in 1958
Blind sports